Michael Conrad Sophus Emil Aubert (2 July 1811 – 8 November 1872) was a Norwegian jurist and politician.

Biography
Aubert was born in Christiania (now Oslo), Norway. He was one of ten children born to Benoni Aubert (1768–1832) and Jakobine Henriette Thaulow (1776-1833).  One of his brother was professor Ludvig Cæsar Martin Aubert (1807–1887).

He graduated as cand.jur. in 1835. He worked as an attorney from 1836, and diocesan attorney (stiftprokurator) in Bergen from 1841. He was then appointed district stipendiary magistrate in  Lofoten og Vesterålen  in Nordland during 1847. While stationed here, he was elected to the Norwegian Parliament in 1851, representing the rural constituency of  Nordlands Amt (now Nordland).

In 1852 he was appointed County Governor of  Nordre Bergenhus Amt (now Sogn og Fjordane). He served as deputy representative to the Parliament in 1857. He lived in Lærdalsøyri during this tenure. 
He made an important contribution to the local economy  by establishing a transport company  with  local merchant Jan Henrik Nitter Hansen (1801–1879) and priest Harald Ulrik Sverdrup (1813–1891).
Founded in 1858, Nordre Bergenhus Amts Dampskibe (later known as Fylkesbaatane i Sogn og Fjordane) was established to provide  steamship service from Bergen. With time the company came to operate ferries, charter service and tourist transportation.

He left the County Governor position in 1860 to become burgomaster of Throndhjem (now Trondheim). He served as deputy representative from the constituency  Throndhjem og Levanger .

From 1866, he resided  at Sande. He was appointed district stipendiary magistrate in Jarlsberg (now Vestfold) a position he held until his death. His replacement as burgomaster was Sivert Christensen Strøm.

References

1811 births
1872 deaths
County governors of Norway
Members of the Storting
Nordland politicians
Sogn og Fjordane politicians
Politicians from Trondheim
Norwegian jurists
d'Aubert family